Batchtown is a village in southern Calhoun County, Illinois, United States. The population was 170 at the 2020 census, down from 214 at the 2010 census. As of 2018, the population had decreased to an estimated 199.

History

The village and the area surrounding it was called Richwoods during the 1850s. Then people started referring to the area as Sam White's, after a leading merchant in Calhoun County. It was later called Batchelder Ville, after William Batchelder, who lived in the village during the 1860s. A post office opened up in the community in 1879 and Batchtown became the official name of the village.

By the time the village was incorporated, there were several stores and shops. The Grand Army of the Republic set up a post in the village and the first Batchtown Methodist Church was set up.

William Batchelder was a leading citizen in the community. He owned and operated a corn mill in Batchtown. He later changed the corn mill into a flour mill. William Batchelder was also a justice of the peace and merchant.

Samuel White was also a leading citizen in Batchtown. He owned a store in the village that sold stock groceries, dry goods, shoes, and hardware. He also sold farm machinery.

Geography

Demographics

As of the 2020 census there were 170 people, 69 households, and 53 families residing in the village. The racial makeup of the village was 97.06% White and 2.94% from two or more races. Hispanic or Latino of any race were 1.76% of the population.

There were 69 households, out of which 81.16% had children under the age of 18 living with them, 73.91% were married couples living together, 2.90% had a female householder with no husband present, and 23.19% were non-families. 23.19% of all households were made up of individuals, and 23.19% had someone living alone who was 65 years of age or older. The average household size was 3.28 and the average family size was 2.93.

The village's age distribution consisted of 35.1% under the age of 18, 1.0% from 18 to 24, 20.9% from 25 to 44, 20.7% from 45 to 64, and 22.3% who were 65 years of age or older. The median age was 43.3 years. For every 100 females, there were 149.4 males. For every 100 females age 18 and over, there were 107.9 males.

The median income for a household in the village was $67,917, and the median income for a family was $83,125. Males had a median income of $70,000 versus $33,750 for females. The per capita income for the village was $27,152. No families and 2.6% of the population were below the poverty line, including none of those under age 18 and 11.1% of those age 65 or over.

Notable people 

 Bill McGee, pitcher for the St. Louis Cardinals and New York Giants

Gallery

References
A New Geography Of Calhoun County

Villages in Illinois
Villages in Calhoun County, Illinois
Illinois populated places on the Mississippi River